Richard Randall may refer to:
 Richard Randall (priest), English Anglican priest
 Richard Randall (physician), physician and colonial agent
 Richard John Randall, Australian artist
 Sir Dick Randall (Richard John Randall), Australian public servant
 SS Richard Randall, a Liberty ship

See also
 Dick Randall (producer), American film producer, screenwriter, actor and assistant director